John Pedersen (born 31 March 1948) is a Danish wrestler. He competed in the men's Greco-Roman 82 kg at the 1972 Summer Olympics.

References

External links
 

1948 births
Living people
Danish male sport wrestlers
Olympic wrestlers of Denmark
Wrestlers at the 1972 Summer Olympics
People from Falster